The 2017 All-Ireland Under 21 Football Championship was an inter-county gaelic football competition between 31 of the 32 counties of Ireland (Kilkenny did not participate). Provincial championships were held in Connacht, Leinster, Munster and Ulster with the winners progressing to the All-Ireland semi-finals.

This was the final year of the Under 21 football championship. Beginning in 2018, it was replaced by an Under 20 championship following a vote at the GAA congress on 26 February 2016.

Dublin beat Galway by 2-13 to 2-7 in the final on 29 April.	
		
The competition was sponsored for the third time by EirGrid.

2017 Connacht Under-21 Football Championship

Quarter-final

 Galway 4-10 Leitrim 2-12 (11 March)

Semi-finals

Final

2017 Leinster Under-21 Football Championship

Preliminary round
Meath 0-12 Westmeath 2-8 (22 February)
Wicklow 0-9 Louth 1-13 (1 March)
Carlow 0-8 Wexford 1-18 (22 February)

Quarter-finals
Dublin 2-14 Westmeath 0-6 (1 March)
Kildare 0-10 Longford 2-6 (1 March)
Wexford 0-6 Offaly 1-6 (1 March)
Laois 2-13 Louth 1-8 (8 March)

Semi-finals

Final

2017 Munster Under-21 Football Championship

Quarter-finals
Kerry 1-17 Clare 2-8 (8 March)
Limerick 0-16 Tipperary 0-14 (8 March)

Semi-finals

Final

2017 Ulster Under-21 Football Championship

Preliminary round
Monaghan 2-16 Antrim 0-16 (8 March)

Quarter-finals

Armagh 2-13 Down 0-12 (15 March)
Cavan 2-19 Fermanagh 0-4 (15 March)
Derry 3-10 Monaghan 1-11 (15 March)
Tyrone 0-14 Donegal 0-14 (after extra-time, 15 March)
Donegal 0-18 Tyrone 1-9 (Replay, 22 March)

Semi-finals

Final

All-Ireland

Semi-finals

Final

References

External links
Full Fixtures and Results

All-Ireland Under-21 Football Championships
All-Ireland Under 21 Football Championship